Lost in New York may refer to:
 Perdues dans New York, a 1989 French film directed by Jean Rollin and titled in English as Lost In New York
 Home Alone 2: Lost in New York, a 1992 film starring Macaulay Culkin